The Centennial Land Run Monument is an art installation by Paul Moore, located in the Oklahoma City Bricktown District, in the U.S. state of Oklahoma. It commemorates the Land Run of 1889 in the Unassigned Lands.

References

External links

 
 Centennial Land Run Monument – OKC, Oklahoma at Waymarking

Bricktown, Oklahoma City
Horses in art
Monuments and memorials in Oklahoma
Outdoor sculptures in Oklahoma City
Sculptures of men in Oklahoma
Sculptures of women in Oklahoma
Statues in Oklahoma
Tourist attractions in Oklahoma City